Dove volano i corvi d'argento (Italian for "Where The Silver Crows Fly") is a 1977 Italian crime-drama film written and directed by Piero Livi and starring Corrado Pani, Jenny Tamburi, Flavio Bucci and Renzo Montagnani.

Plot
A young Italian man who witnesses a kidnapping is killed by criminals.  The victim's brother, a Milan metalworker, is then pressured by family and friends to take revenge on his brother's killers.

Cast 

Corrado Pani as  Istevene
Jenny Tamburi as  Giovannangela
Flavio Bucci as  Simbula
Renzo Montagnani as  Maineddu 
Giampiero Albertini as Istevene's Father
Regina Bianchi as Istevene's Mother
Piero Gerlini as  Maresciallo
Paolo Malco as Podda
Mariangela Giordano as  Basilia
Massimo De Rossi as Stintino
Bruno Corazzari as Killer

References

External links

Italian crime drama films
1977 crime drama films
1977 films
Films set in Sardinia
Italian films about revenge
1970s Italian-language films
1970s Italian films